{{Infobox person
| name          = Jan Decleir
| image         =Jandecleir677.jpg
| imagesize     =
| caption       = Jan Decleir in 2003
| birth_name     = Jan Amanda Gustaaf Decleir
| birth_date     = 
| birth_place      = Niel, Belgium
| death_date     =
| death_place    =
| height        =
| other_names     =
| website      =
| notable_works  = "Priest Daens" in Daens;"Dreverhaven" in Character;"Angelo Ledda" in The Memory of a Killer
| awards = Best Supporting Actor2007 WolfsbergenCulture Prize2003 Lifetime AchievementGrolsch Film Award1997 Character| spouse        =
}}

Jan Decleir (born as Jan Amanda Gustaaf Decleir on 14 February 1946) is a prolific Belgian movie and stage actor born in Niel, Antwerp.

Career
He had his first big role in Fons Rademakers's Mira (1971). Since then, he has appeared in countless Flemish and Dutch films and TV productions. In the world of theater he gained his fame by acting at the International New Scene for the play Mistero Buffo by Dario Fo. 
To the larger audiences of television he became known through his role of Sil de strandjutter in 1976 in the equally named TV series. He starred in Academy Award winning movies including Karakter by Mike van Diem and Antonia and the Oscar-nominated social drama Daens. More recently he turned down roles in Stanley Kubrick's Eyes Wide Shut (due to commitments to other projects) and the James Bond film The World Is Not Enough. Decleir was also Belgium's national performer of Sinterklaas from 1993 until 2019.

In 2003 he had the starring role in the critically acclaimed thriller The Memory of a Killer (The Alzheimer Case) of which the leading American critic Roger Ebert wrote in his review: "Jan Decleir never goes for the easy effect, never pushes too hard, is a rock-solid occupant of his character. Everything he has to say is embodied, not expressed. Talks are under way for a Hollywood remake, but this performance will not be easily equaled. Gene Hackman, maybe. Morgan Freeman. Robert Mitchum, if he were alive. Decleir is the real thing."For several years he also led the Studio Herman Teirnlick where he brought in many new teachers: actors from various theater companies (e.g., de Blauwe Maandag Compagnie, STAN, etc.). 

Personal life
Jan Decleir has been married to Brechtje Louwaard since 1 April 2006. He was previously married to Caroline van Gastel with whom he has 3 children (Sofie, Jenne and Flor). Both his siblings – sister Reinhilde Decleir (died in 2022) and brother Dirk Decleir (died in 1974) involved in acting, too. 

Awards

Over the lifespan of his career Jan Decleir has received several prizes for his acting. He was awarded the Best Actor Award for his role in Off Screen (directed by Pieter Kuijpers) at the Montreal World Film Festival. In 2003 he received Golden Calf Culture Prize (Dutch: Gouden Kalf') and in 2007 a Golden Calf for Best Supporting Actor for the movie Wolfsbergen at the Netherlands Film Festival.
In 2008 he was awarded the best actor prize at the Tiburon International Film Festival for his role in Man zkt vrouw (A Perfect Match). 
For his role in The Barons, he received the Magritte Award for Best Supporting Actor.
In 2013 he also received the Flemish Culture Prize for General Cultural Merit. 

Filmography

 Heeft geleden onder Pontius Pilatus (1966)
 Geboorte en dood van Dirk Vandersteen jr. (1968)
 Het huis met de maskers (1968)
 De meeuw (1968)
 Klucht van de brave moordenaar (1969)
 Koning Lear (=King Lear) (1969)
 Het Helleschip (1969)
 Zeven miljoen molekulen (1970)
 De Familie Tot (1971)
 Mira, aka Mira of de teleurgang van de waterhoek (1971)
 August, August, August (1971)
 Rolande met de bles (1972)
 De Loteling (The Conscript) (1973)
 De Vrek (1974)
 Verloren maandag (1974)
 Verbrande brug (Burned bridge) (1975)
 Pallieter (1976)
 De man in de rok en de man zonder (1976)
 Niet alle dieven komen ongelegen (1976)
 Als schilders konden spreken (1976)
 Une page d'amour (=one page of love) (1978)
 Doodzonde (=Mortal Sin) (1978)
 De proefkonijnen (1979)
 Grueten broos (1979)
 Le Grand Paysage d'Alexis Droeven (1981)
 Twee vorstinnen en een vorst (=Two contessas and a count) (1981)
 Tijd om gelukkig te zijn (=Time to be happy) (1982)
 Het verleden (1982)
 Toute une nuit (=A Whole/Entire Night) (1982)
 Maria Danneels (of het leven dat we droomden) (1982)
 Zware jongens (1984)
 De Loteling (1984)
 John The Fearless (1984)
 De Leeuw van Vlaanderen (= the Flemish lion) (1985)
 Het gezin van Paemel (=The Van Paemel family) (1986)
 De Tijger (1988)
 Het eerste mirakel van kindeke Jesus (1988)
 Het Sacrament (1990)
 Koko Flanel (1990)
 Dilemma (1990)
 Anchoress (1993)
 Daens (1993)
 Beck - De gesloten kamer (1993)
 Antonia's Line (1995)
 Camping Cosmos (1996)
 Character (1997)
 S. (1998)
 Taming the Floods (1999)
 Retour Den Haag (1999)
 Molokai: The Story of Father Damien (aka Molokai: The Forbidden Island) (1999)
 Shades (1999)
 Kruimeltje (=Little crumb) (1999)
 Running Free (2000)
 Lijmen/Het Been (=The publishers) (2000)
 Mariken (2000)
 De omweg (2000)
 De verlossing (=Closure aka The other life) (2001)
 Villa des Roses (2002)
 Hop (2002)
 Brush with Fate (2003)
 Rosenstrasse(2003) (=Rosenstraße)
 SuperTex (= Supertex – Eine Stunde im Paradies)
 Till Eusterspiegel (=Jester Till) (2003)
 Vlucht der verbeelding (2003)
 De Zaak Alzheimer  (2003)
 L'Autre (=The missing) (2003)
 De passievrucht (=Father's affair) (2003)
 Edelweißpiraten (=Edelweiss pirates) (2004)
 De kus (=The Kiss) (2004)
 Off screen (2005)
 Een Ander Zijn Geluk (2005)
 Verlengd weekend (2005)
 Het Paard van Sinterklaas (2005)
 Crusade in Jeans (=Kruistocht in Spijkerbroek) (2005)
 Wolfsbergen (2007) – see Nanouk LeopoldFirmin(=Firmin den bokser) (2007)
 Man zkt vrouw (A Perfect Match) (2007)
 Blind (2007)
 Loft (2008)
 The Barons (2009)
 De schaduw van Bonifatius (2010)
 Nova Zembla (2011)
Flying Home (2014)
 The Surprise (2015)
 Blind Spot (2017)

He is also known from Flemish TV series such as:
 Keromar (1971)
 Sil de strandjutter  (1976)
 Adriaen Brouwer (1986)
 Klein Londen, Klein Berlijn (1988)
 Moeder, waarom leven wij? (1993)
 Dag Sinterklaas (1993)
 Ons geluk (1995)
 Gaston Berghmans Show (1995)
 Kulderzipken (1996)
 Diamant (1997)
 Grote boze wolf show (2000)
 Stille waters (2001)
 De 9 dagen van de gier (2001)
 Meiden van De Wit (2002)
 Koning van de wereld (2005)
 Als 't maar beweegt (2005)
 De kavijaks (2005)

TheatreMARX (2018)
 Risjaar Drei (2017)
 Onvoltooid verleden (2012)
 Bloedarm (2002)
 Lucifer (2010)
 En verlos ons van het kwade (1999)
 All for love (1992)
 Gilles! (1988)
 DE TIJGER (1988)
 Obscene Fabels (1984–1985)
 De parochie van miserie (1972)
 De meeuw (1968)
 Het goudland'' (1966)

References

External links

Jan Decleir on Cinenews

1946 births
Flemish male television actors
20th-century Flemish male actors
Golden Calf winners
Flemish male film actors
Living people
Magritte Award winners
21st-century Flemish male actors
Sinterklaas